The Bet may refer to:

 The Bet (short story), an 1889 short story by Anton Chekhov
 The Bet (1990 film), a Polish film
 The Bet (1992 film), a short film directed by Ted Demme
 The Bet (1997 film) (French: Le Pari), a French film
 The Bet (2006 film), an Australian film directed by Mark Lee
 The Bet (2016 film), an American comedy film
 "The Bet" (Brooklyn Nine-Nine), a first season episode of Brooklyn Nine-Nine
 "The Bet" (Recess episode), a season 3 episode in the Disney animated television series Recess
 "The Bet", an unaired Seinfeld (season 2) episode
 "The Bet", a season 2 (2004) episode of the Nickelodeon television comedy series Drake & Josh
 "The Bet", the second episode of Men Behaving Badly

See also
 Bet (disambiguation)